Blaž Kavčič was the defending champion, but retired from his first round match with a back injury.
Victor Hănescu won the title, defeating Andreas Haider-Maurer 6–4, 6–1 in the final.

Seeds

Draw

Finals

Top half

Bottom half

References
 Main Draw
 Qualifying Draw

Banja Luka Challenger - Singles
2012 Singles